Google Page Creator was a website creation and hosting service by Google. It was a tool for basic website design, requiring no HTML or CSS knowledge.

In September 2008, Google announced that it would not accept new sign-ups to Page Creator, instead encouraging users to use Google Sites. The service was shut down in 2009, whilst existing published pages migrated to Google Sites.

One of the more famous use cases of the service was levarburton.com.

See also
 Blogger (service)

References 
 

Page Creator
Free web hosting services
Products and services discontinued in 2009